Kehel is a village in Shal Rural District, Shahrud District, Khalkhal County, Ardabil Province, Iran. At the 2006 census, its population was 131, in 40 families.

References 

Towns and villages in Khalkhal County